An equilateral triathlon is a triathlon in which each leg would take an approximately equal time. These triathlons were proposed by Wainer and De Veaux (1994) to redress the bias in favour of cycling over running and particularly over swimming in standard triathlons. Cycling occupies about 78% of the typical race distances, running 19%, and swimming 3%. Based on world-record times for similar distances, cycling would take 54% of race time, running 31%, and swimming 15%. 

In Wainer and De Veaux's equilateral triathlons, cycling should take approximately 33% of race time, running 33%, and swimming 33% for a ratio of roughly 1:8:3.5  for distances of swimming / cycling / running. Examples would be: 

Wainer and De Veaux's proposal appears to have had little influence on triathlon race distances. Isoman Triathlon is a triathlon race with distances roughly equal to the stated portion.

References 
 Preprint (Educational Testing Service Research Report RR-94-15)

Triathlon